Ch. Shargleam Blackcap, (born 26 June 1977) – also known as Brett – was a Flat-Coated Retriever show dog bred.  Handled by Mrs Pat Chapman he won Best in Show at Crufts in 1980. He is a direct ancestor of both Sh Ch. Vbos The Kentuckian and Ch. Almanza Backseat Driver, who won best in show at Crufts in 2011 and 2022 respectively.

Show history
In 1980, Brett became the first Flat-Coated Retriever to win Best in Show at Crufts. Reserve Best in Show went to the previous year's winner, the Kerry Blue Terrier Ch. Callaghan of Leander. He was the most successful showdog of his breed in his era, and became a successful sire. Crufts Best in Show has twice since been awarded to Flat-Coated Retrievers, Sh Ch. Vbos The Kentuckian in 2011 and Ch. Almanza Backseat Driver in 2022, both of which are descended from Brett. Brett was the last Flat-Coated Retriever to win a Best in Show in a multi-breed show until Vbos The Kentuckian at the East of England show in 2009.

Pedigree

References

External links
Crufts Official Website

1977 animal births
Best in Show winners of Crufts